PMV may refer to:

 Panicum mosaic virus, a plant virus known for infecting St. Augustine Grass
 Paramyxoviridae, or paramyxovirus, a family of viruses found in animals
 Parcels and Miscellaneous Van, an item of railway rolling stock
 Participatiemaatschappij Vlaanderen, an independent organization of the Flemish government
 Port Metro Vancouver, a corporation established by the Canadian government for managing port use and shipping in the Metro Vancouver area
 Bushmaster Protected Mobility Vehicle, an Australian armored vehicle
 Del Caribe "Santiago Mariño" International Airport, IATA code PMV
 Predicted Mean Vote, a model for measuring thermal comfort